This is list of archives in Colombia.

Archives in Colombia 

 National Archives of Colombia
 Fundación Patrimonio Fílmico Colombiano
 Archivo Central e Histórico de la Universidad Nacional de Colombia
 Archivo Histórico de la Universidad del Rosario
 Archivo de Bogotá
 Instituto Caro y Cuervo
 Universidad del Norte, Barranquilla, Biblioteca Karl C. Parrish, Colecciones Especiales

See also 
 List of archives
 List of museums in Colombia
 Culture of Colombia
 Portal de Archivos Españoles (federated search of archives in Spain)

External links 
 General Archives (all)

 
Archives
Colombia
Archives